The Dayton metropolitan area is the metropolitan area centered on Dayton, Ohio.

Dayton metropolitan area may also refer to:

The Dayton micropolitan area surrounding Dayton, Tennessee

See also
Dayton (disambiguation)